Jemal Singleton (December 7, 1975) is an American football coach who is the assistant head coach and running backs coach for the Philadelphia Eagles of the National Football League (NFL). He previously served as an assistant coach for the Cincinnati Bengals, Oakland Raiders, Indianapolis Colts, University of Arkansas, Oklahoma State University–Stillwater and the United States Air Force Academy.

Coaching career

Air Force
In 2000, Singleton began his coaching career at the United States Air Force Academy, his alma mater, as a prep assistant. In 2003, Singleton was hired as a varsity assistant coach. In 2006, Singleton was promoted to running backs coach.

Oklahoma State
In 2011, Singleton joined as the running backs coach at Oklahoma State University–Stillwater.

Arkansas
In 2015, Singleton was hired by the University of Arkansas as their running backs coach.

Indianapolis Colts
In 2016, Singleton was hired by the Indianapolis Colts as their running backs coach under head coach Chuck Pagano. In his two seasons with Indianapolis, Singleton helped Frank Gore amass 1,986 rushing yards, the ninth-most in the NFL during that span. Gore came just shy of 1,000 yards in 2017, finishing 12th in the NFL with 961 yards on the ground. In 2016, he guided Gore to his ninth 1,000-yard season, becoming the first Colts rusher to eclipse 1,000 yards since RB Joseph Addai in 2007, and also becoming the first running back age 33-or-older to rush for at least 1,000 yards since John Riggins in 1984 (fourth player overall).

Oakland Raiders
On January 11, 2018, Singleton was hired by the Oakland Raiders as their running backs coach under head coach Jon Gruden.

Cincinnati Bengals
On February 10, 2019, Singleton was  hired by the Cincinnati Bengals as their running backs coach under head coach Zac Taylor.

Kentucky Wildcats
On January 7, 2021 Singleton was hired by the University of Kentucky as their running backs coach and special teams coordinator.

Philadelphia Eagles
On February 8, 2021, Singleton was  hired by the Philadelphia Eagles as their assistant head coach and running backs coach under head coach Nick Sirianni, replacing Duce Staley.

Personal life
Singleton is married to his wife, Jennifer, and they have two daughters together.

In 1999, Singleton graduated from the United States Air Force Academy with a bachelor's degree in social sciences.

References

External links
Indianapolis Colts bio

Living people
Indianapolis Colts coaches
Oakland Raiders coaches
Kentucky Wildcats football coaches
Arkansas Razorbacks football coaches
Air Force Falcons football players
Air Force Falcons football coaches
United States Air Force Academy alumni
1975 births
Cincinnati Bengals coaches
Philadelphia Eagles coaches